Jorge Ocampo (born October 24, 1989) is a Mexican professional footballer who plays for Tapachula of Ascenso MX on loan UAT.

External links

Liga MX players
Living people
Sportspeople from León, Guanajuato
1989 births
Mexican footballers

Association footballers not categorized by position